Guido Andreozzi and Ariel Behar were the defending champions but only Behar chose to defend his title, partnering Thiago Monteiro. Behar lost in the first round to David Pérez Sanz and Oriol Roca Batalla.

Kevin Krawietz and Andreas Mies won the title after defeating Sander Gillé and Joran Vliegen 7–6(8–6), 2–6, [10–6] in the final.

Seeds

Draw

References

External links
 Main draw

Casino Admiral Trophy - Doubles